Steelcase Inc. is an American manufacturer of furniture, casegoods, seating, and storage and partitioning systems for offices, hospitals, classrooms, and residential interiors. It is headquartered in Grand Rapids, Michigan, USA.

History 
Originally known as The Metal Office Furniture Company, Steelcase was founded by Peter Martin Wege in 1912. Prior to starting the company, Wege had filed approximately 25 patents related to the sheet metal and fireproofing industries. The Metal Office Furniture Company's first products included fireproof metal safes and four-drawer metal filing cabinets.

In 1914, the company received its first product patent for "The Victor", a fireproof steel wastebasket. The Victor gained popularity due to its light weight—achieved through a patented process of bending flat steel at right angles to create boxes—and its ability to prevent fires at a time when smoking was common indoors, particularly in the workplace. In 1915, the company began manufacturing and distributing steel desks after designing and producing 200 for Boston's first skyscraper, the Custom House Tower. In 1937, the company collaborated with Frank Lloyd Wright on office furniture for the Johnson Wax Headquarters. The partnership lasted two years and resulted in some of the first modern workstations.

The name Steelcase was a result of an advertising campaign to promote metal office furniture over wood and was trademarked in 1921. The company officially changed its name to Steelcase, Inc. in 1954.

The company became an industry leader in the late 1960s due to the volume of its sales. Steelcase expanded into new markets during the 1970s, including Asia, Europe, and North Africa. In 1973, the company debuted the Series 9000 furniture line, a panel-based office system that became a best seller and the company's flagship brand. That same year, the company delivered the largest single furniture shipment to the then-new Sears Tower. The delivery included 43,565 pieces of furniture and furnished 44 floors.

During the 1980s and 1990s, Steelcase was working closely with architects and interior designers to develop products as well the company's own workspace in Grand Rapids. The company's current headquarters were built in 1983 on 901 44th St. SE in Grand Rapids, Michigan. In 1989, Steelcase opened the pyramid-shaped Steelcase Inc. Corporate Development Center. The center contained ten research laboratories and workspaces meant to encourage interdisciplinary collaboration on product development. Steelcase vacated the Pyramid in 2010, and the Pyramid was sold to Switch (company) in 2016. In 1996, Steelcase became the majority stakeholder in design firm IDEO and the firm's CEO, David M. Kelley, became Steelcase's vice president of technical discovery and innovation. Steelcase sold its shares back to IDEO's managers starting in 2007.

In 1996, Steelcase was found at fault in a patent infringement suit brought against them by Haworth, Inc., another furniture company. Steelcase was ordered to pay $211.5 million in damages and interest, thus ending a 17-year dispute with Haworth.

Steelcase became a publicly traded company in 1998 under the symbol SCS.  During the 2000s, Steelcase reorganized its workforce and began integrating modern technologies in its products. In 2000, the company opened Steelcase University, a center for ongoing employee development and learning. Steelcase's wood furniture plant in Caledonia, MI earned LEED certification in 2001, becoming the first plant to receive the certification. In 2002, Steelcase partnered with IBM to create BlueSpace, a "smart office" prototype designed using new office technologies. In 2010, Steelcase and IDEO launched new models for higher education classrooms called LearnLabs.

In January 2016 the company recalled 12 models of Steelcase "Rocky" style swivel chairs manufactured between 2005 and 2015, due to fall hazard.

Noteworthy products

Steelcase released Multiple 15 desks in 1946, which introduced standardized desk sizing and became a universal industry standard. Series 9000 was released in 1973 and became Steelcase's most popular line of office systems. The Leap chair, introduced in 1999, sold 5,000 units a week during its first year and became the company's most popular release. The ergonomic office chair was designed with eight adjustable areas for users to control, including chair height, armrest positioning, lumbar support, seat depth, and back positioning. The chair was developed over four years, cost $35 million to design, and resulted in 11 academic studies and 23 patents. The company released the Gesture chair in 2013, which is designed to support the way workers naturally sit.

Steelcase innovates the industry with the 1945 Metal Office Furniture Company path in an attempt to be more sustainable. The idea started when Steelcase saw the need for furniture to be personalized for custom size spaces with the ability to be able to fix a broken part if necessary. This series then came to be over 200 compatible arrangements for tables and desks. The process for this simple assembly of parts for the new design was to repair, replace or recycle as many times as the user needs.

Brands
Subsidiaries include AMQ, Coalesse, Halcon, Orangebox, Smith System, and Viccarbe, as well as several other brands such as Steelcase Health and Education. The company established an office accessories brand called Details in 1990. In 1993, Steelcase launched Turnstone, a line of furniture designed for small businesses and home offices. Designtex, which produces interior textiles and upholstery, was acquired in 1998. Nurture was founded in 2006 to create products for the health care industry, including furniture and interiors for waiting rooms, offices, and clinics. The brand became Steelcase Health in 2014.

Steelcase merged three of its subsidiaries (Brayton International, Metro Furniture and Vecta) to form Coalesse in 2008. Coalesse products are meant for what the company calls "live/work" spaces, a result of the frequent overlap of home and office in modern working habits.

Company culture

In 1985, Steelcase purchased the Meyer May House designed by Frank Lloyd Wright and restored it, opening it to the public in 1987. A corporate art program has resulted in a collection including pieces by Pablo Picasso, Andy Warhol and Dale Chihuly.

The company employs a research group called WorkSpace Futures to study workplace trends.  In 2010, Steelcase underwent a three-year project to update its Grand Rapids headquarters to promote employee productivity and employee well-being, including redesigning a cafeteria into an all-purpose work environment that provides food service and space for meetings, socializing, and independent work.

Steelcase's sustainability efforts have included reducing packaging, using regional facilities to reduce shipping distance, cutting greenhouse gas emissions and water consumption, and a goal to reduce its environmental footprint by 25 percent by 2020. As of 2012, Steelcase had reduced its waste by 80 percent, greenhouse gas emissions by 37 percent and water consumption by 54 percent since 2006. According to the company's WorkFutures group, the company also analyzes its supply chain and materials chemistry to determine product sustainability. As of 2014, the company led its industry in Cradle to Cradle-certified products. In 2016, Steelcase employees volunteered 38,913 hours and the Steelcase Foundation donated more than US$5.7 million.

Steelcase became Carbon Neutral on August 25, 2020, with the plan of becoming Carbon negative (eliminating more carbon than they produce) by 2030. As a company they have a focus on green chemistry and have stopped manufacturing with many chemicals like Polyvinyl chloride (PVC).

Covid-19 Response 
As of March 2020, Steelcase has been manufacturing equipment for health care providers and medical facilities in response to COVID-19. Solutions include PPE, masks, face shields, and social screens.

Steelcase is also redesigning offices layouts that can adapt to the ongoing Covid regulations. To continue interaction in the workplace, they have installed social screens to divide desks/workspaces and are planning to implement more technology to enhance communication whether the staff is in the office or working from home. Desks will be six feet apart as per the United States CDC guidelines and there will be a focus on sanitization stations.

Awards

Company Awards 
 The company won the Editors' Choice award at the 2014 NeoCon product competition for "Quiet Spaces", a series of workspaces designed for introverts and a collaboration with Susan Cain, author of Quiet: The Power of Introverts in a World That Can't Stop Talking.
 Steelcase was named The World's Most Admired Company by Forbes in 2018, 2019 and 2020. They earned the 2020 Civic Award.

Design Awards 
 2014 Steelcase's SOTO II Worktools won a Silver Award in the Office Accessories category from Editor's Choice.
 2018 Best Large Showroom and Best of Competition at NeoCon
 2019 Steelcase won the Red Dot Award in 2019 for their SILQ chair design.
 2021 Best of NeoCon Gold and Best of NeoCon Innovation Awards

Similar companies 
 Global Furniture Group
 Haworth
 Herman Miller
 Knoll
 Vitra

References

External links

Furniture companies of the United States
Manufacturing companies based in Grand Rapids, Michigan
Industrial design
Manufacturing companies established in 1912
1912 establishments in Michigan
Companies listed on the New York Stock Exchange